Mount Rexford is a prominent  mountain summit located in the Cascade Mountains of southwestern British Columbia, Canada. Precipitation runoff from the peak drains into Nesakwatch and Centre Creeks, both tributaries of the Chilliwack River. Originally known as Ensawkwatch, the mountain was named for an early settler in the area, Rexford, who had a cabin near Slesse Creek and had trap lines in the vicinity. The mountain has two subsidiary peaks known as the Nesakwatch Spires. The mountain's name was officially adopted on June 2, 1950, by the Geographical Names Board of Canada. Mount Rexford was first climbed in July 1951 by Herman Genschorek and Walt Sparling via the West Ridge.

Geology

Mount Rexford is composed of granitic rock related to the Chilliwack batholith, which intruded the region 26 to 29 million years ago after the major orogenic episodes in the region. This is part of the Pemberton Volcanic Belt, an eroded volcanic belt that formed as a result of subduction of the Farallon Plate starting 29 million years ago. 

During the Pleistocene period dating back over two million years ago, glaciation advancing and retreating repeatedly scoured the landscape leaving deposits of rock debris. The "U"-shaped cross section of the river valleys are a result of recent glaciation. Uplift and faulting in combination with glaciation have been the dominant processes which have created the tall peaks and deep valleys of the North Cascades area.

The North Cascades features some of the most rugged topography in the Cascade Range with craggy peaks and ridges, deep glacial valleys, and granite spires. Geological events occurring many years ago created the diverse topography and drastic elevation changes over the Cascade Range leading to various climate differences which lead to vegetation variety defining the ecoregions in this area.

Climate

Based on the Köppen climate classification, Mount Rexford is located in the marine west coast climate zone of western North America. Most weather fronts originate in the Pacific Ocean, and travel east toward the Cascade Range where they are forced upward by the range (Orographic lift), causing them to drop their moisture in the form of rain or snowfall. As a result, the Cascade Mountains experience high precipitation, especially during the winter months in the form of snowfall. Winter temperatures can drop below −20 °C with wind chill factors below −30 °C. The months July through September offer the most favorable weather for climbing Rexford.

Climbing Routes

Established rock climbing routes on Mount Rexford:

 West Ridge -  First Ascent 1951
 Northeast Ridge -   FA 1969 
 The Priest-Coupe (NE couloir) -  FA 1970 
 East Ridge -  FA 1973
 South Ridge -  FA 1981 
 Southwest Flank -  
 Southeast Arete -

See also

 Geography of British Columbia
 Geology of British Columbia

References

External links
 Rexford's west face (aerial photo): PBase
 Nesakwatch Spires Rock Climbing: Mountainproject.com
 Weather forecast: Mount Rexford

Two-thousanders of British Columbia
Canadian Cascades
Pemberton Volcanic Belt
Cascade Range
North Cascades
Yale Division Yale Land District